Samydaceae is a family of tropical and subtropical woody plants, its best known genus being Casearia. It has always been of uncertain placement, in the past usually being submerged in the family Flacourtiaceae.

A 2002 paper included the Samydaceae in the family Salicaceae, a placement accepted in the APG III system onwards and also by Plants of the World Online . This placement has by no means been universally accepted.

References

External links
 Tree of Life Samydaceae

Malpighiales
Malpighiales families
Historically recognized angiosperm families